The Right Direction is a 1916 American comedy silent film directed by E. Mason Hopper, written by Julia Crawford Ivers, and starring Vivian Martin, Colin Chase, Herbert Standing, Alfred Hollingsworth, Billy Mason and Baby Jack White. The film was released on December 21, 1916, by Paramount Pictures.

Plot
It is a story of a little ragged girl that thinks she can walk to California in order that her little brother will get well. The many trials she goes through in getting to California with her four-year-old brother and a ragged dog.

Cast 
Vivian Martin as Polly Eccles
Colin Chase as Kirk Drummond
Herbert Standing as John Drummond
Alfred Hollingsworth as Big Bill
Billy Mason as Harry Lockwood
Baby Jack White as Billy Boy
William Jefferson (actor) as Jack Marsh

References

External links 
 

1916 films
1910s English-language films
Silent American comedy films
1916 comedy films
Paramount Pictures films
Films directed by E. Mason Hopper
American black-and-white films
American silent feature films
1910s American films